Middlefork is an unincorporated community in Lancaster Township, Jefferson County, Indiana.

The community took its name from the Middle Fork Creek.

Geography

References

Unincorporated communities in Jefferson County, Indiana
Unincorporated communities in Indiana